It's Real is the second studio album by American band Ex Hex. It was released on March 22, 2019, through Merge Records.

Track listing

References

2019 albums
Ex Hex (band) albums
Merge Records albums